is a Japanese sprinter who specializes in the 100 metres.

He won the bronze medal in the Medley relay at the 2009 World Youth Championships in Athletics.

Personal bests

International competition record

References

External links
 
 Takumi Kuki at JAAF 
 

1992 births
Living people
People from Wakayama Prefecture
Japanese male sprinters
Waseda University alumni
21st-century Japanese people